Castleton is an unincorporated community in Rappahannock County in the U.S. state of Virginia. It is located northwest of Culpeper.

Culture 
Maestro Lorin Maazel maintained a  estate in Castleton, and made it the focus of the Castleton Festival every summer.

The George L. Carder House and Scrabble School are listed on the National Register of Historic Places.

Notable people 
Lorin Maazel  (1930–2014)
Dietlinde Turban (*1957)

References

External links
Castleton Festival online

Unincorporated communities in Rappahannock County, Virginia
Unincorporated communities in Virginia